Dead & Company Summer Tour 2019 was a concert tour by the rock band Dead & Company. It was the follow-up to the band's Dead & Company Summer Tour 2018. The tour comprised 19 dates across 14 locations from May 31 to July 6, 2019.

Tour dates

Musicians
Bob Weir – guitar, vocals
Mickey Hart – drums
Bill Kreutzmann – drums
John Mayer – guitar, vocals
Oteil Burbridge – bass, percussion, vocals
Jeff Chimenti – keyboards, vocals

See also
 Reunions of the Grateful Dead

References

External links
Dead & Company official website

2019 concert tours
Dead & Company concert tours